Godfrey Smith (14 July 1878 - 1 August 1944) was Archdeacon of Furness from 1926 until his death.

He was educated at Charterhouse, Magdalen College, Oxford and Wells Theological College; and ordained in 1903. After curacies in Barrow-in-Furness and Grange-over-Sands he held incumbencies at Walney Island, Cartmel, Wentworth, South Yorkshire (where he was also Chaplain to the 7th Earl Fitzwilliam and Haverthwaite.

Notes

1878 births
1944 deaths
People educated at Charterhouse School
Alumni of Magdalen College, Oxford
Alumni of Wells Theological College
Archdeacons of Furness